Kinver Edge Hillfort, is a univallate Iron Age hillfort with a massive rampart and outer ditch along the south-west and south-east sides, with natural defences on the remaining sides. The fort is located at the northern end of Kinver Edge, in the civil parish of Kinver, Staffordshire.

References

External links
 Kinver Hillfort - National Trust

Hill forts in Staffordshire
Scheduled monuments in Staffordshire
South Staffordshire District
National Trust properties in Staffordshire